Colm Murphy (born 1952) is an Irish former Gaelic footballer. He played for club side Nemo Rangers and at inter-county level with the Cork senior football team.

Career
Murphy first came to prominence as a Gaelic footballer at schools' level with Coláiste Chríost Rí. He simultaneously lined out with the Nemo Rangers club at juvenile and underage levels before joining the club's senior team in 1970. Murphy was a mainstay of the team for several years, and won four All-Ireland Club Championship titles, including one as team captain. His silverware at club level also includes seven Munster Club Championships, while he also became the first player to win eight Cork County Championship medals. Murphy was a member of the Cork senior football team for two seasons.

Honours
Nemo Rangers
All-Ireland Senior Club Football Championship: 1973, 1979, 1982 (c), 1984
Munster Senior Club Football Championship: 1972, 1974, 1975, 1978, 1981, 1983, 1987
Cork Senior Football Championship: 1972, 1974, 1975, 1977, 1978, 1981, 1983, 1987

References

1952 births
Living people
Cork inter-county Gaelic footballers
Dual players
ESB people
Nemo Rangers Gaelic footballers
Nemo Rangers hurlers